The Balfrin Höhenweg is a high level footpath in Switzerland between Grächen and Saas-Fee and is part of the Monte Rosa tour. It is also known as Grächen–Saas Fee Höhenweg.

References

Hiking trails in Switzerland